Johnny W. Shaw (born January 5, 1942 in Laconia, Tennessee) is an American politician and a Democratic member of the Tennessee House of Representatives representing District 80 since January 2001.

Elections

2000 When District 80 Republican Representative Page Walley left the Legislature and left the seat open, Shaw ran in the three-way August 3, 2000 Democratic Primary, winning with 2,216 votes (47.1%), and won the November 7, 2000 General election with 10,588 votes (84.3%) against Independent candidate Sheila Godwin.
2002 Shaw was challenged by returning 2000 opponent Sheila Godwin in the August 1, 2002 Democratic Primary, winning with 4,474 votes (78.7%), and was unopposed for the November 5, 2002 General election, winning with 9,583 votes.
2004 Shaw was challenged in the August 5, 2004 Democratic Primary, winning with 3,368 votes (87.1%), and was unopposed for the November 2, 2004 General election, winning with 14,275 votes.
2006 Shaw was unopposed for the August 3, 2006 Democratic Primary, winning with 5,109 votes, and won the November 7, 2006 General election with 9,615 votes (68.0%) against Independent candidate James Wolfe.
2008 Shaw was unopposed for both the August 7, 2008 Democratic Primary, winning with 1,469 votes, and the November 4, 2008 General election, winning with 17,917 votes.
2010 Shaw was unopposed for the August 5, 2010 Democratic Primary, winning with 4,793 votes, and won the November 2, 2010 General election with 7,638 votes (56.6%) against Republican nominee Mark Johnstone.
2012 Shaw was unopposed for both the August 2, 2012 Democratic Primary, winning with 4,416 votes, and the November 6, 2012 General election, winning with 17,697 votes.

References

External links
Official page at the Tennessee General Assembly

Johnny Shaw at Ballotpedia
Johnny W. Shaw at the National Institute on Money in State Politics

1942 births
Living people
African-American state legislators in Tennessee
Democratic Party members of the Tennessee House of Representatives
People from Fayette County, Tennessee
People from Bolivar, Tennessee
21st-century American politicians
21st-century African-American politicians
20th-century African-American people